Stephen Caracappa and Louis Eppolito were former New York City Police Department (NYPD) detectives who worked on behalf of the Five Families of the American Mafia, principally the Lucchese and Gambino crime families, while they committed various illegal activities. The two became known as the "Mafia Cops". 

The United States Attorney for the Eastern District of New York indicted Caracappa and Eppolito in 2005 on charges of racketeering conspiracy for a pattern of murders, kidnappings, witness tampering, obstruction of justice, money laundering, and narcotics dealing with mobsters and mob associates. The acts stretched from the 1980s in New York City to the 2000s in Las Vegas. Both were convicted in 2006, and sentenced to life imprisonment in 2009. Both died in prison in the late 2010s.

Police careers

Caracappa

Stephen Caracappa (November 12, 1942 – April 8, 2017) had worked in the NYPD's organized crime unit in Brooklyn, New York City, since the late 1970s before he eventually retired on a disability pension in 1992, living for a time in Great Kills, Staten Island. He subsequently worked as a private investigator and retired in the mid-1990s, moving to Las Vegas along with Eppolito. Caracappa worked inside the Las Vegas Women's Correctional Facility as a correctional officer. While on trial in 2006, both he and Eppolito claimed that they were discriminated against during the proceedings.

Eppolito

Louis Eppolito (July 22, 1948 – November 3, 2019) was born in Brooklyn, New York City, and raised in East Flatbush. He was the son of Theresa Eppolito, a registered nurse, and Ralph Eppolito, an associate of the Gambino crime family. Eppolito's paternal uncle and cousin, James Eppolito and James Eppolito Jr., were also both made members of the Gambino crime family, belonging to capo Nino Gaggi's crew. Growing up, Eppolito became acquainted with several other mobsters. His uncle and cousin were eventually murdered by both Gaggi and Gambino family soldier Roy DeMeo, with the permission of Gambino boss Paul Castellano. When he applied to the New York City Police Department (NYPD) in 1969, Eppolito falsely stated that he was unrelated to organized crime figures.

Eppolito eventually rose to the rank of detective in 1977, a job which garnered him a number of headlines. In 1983, he was suspected and cleared of passing NYPD intelligence reports to Rosario Gambino, a distant relative of Castellano and Carlo Gambino. Eppolito retired as a police officer in late 1990. In 1992, Eppolito wrote a book, Mafia Cop: The Story of an Honest Cop Whose Family Was the Mob, in which he spoke of his attempts to avoid being dragged into the Mafia and having to fight for his reputation as a result of the Rosario Gambino corruption case, which he cited as a reason for his leaving the NYPD.

After meeting actor Joe Pesci in Cafe Central, a restaurant frequented by celebrities, Eppolito had a minor career as an actor, with small roles in movies including Lost Highway, Predator 2 and Goodfellas. He moved to Las Vegas around 1994 and sold automobiles at the Infiniti dealership, where he would entertain fellow salesmen with crime scene photos from his time on the force.

Mafia careers
By 1985, federal authorities recognized Caracappa and Eppolito as associates of the Mafia in New York City. Caracappa was at this point a member of the Organized Crime Homicide Unit within the NYPD Major Case Squad based in Brooklyn. Both were known for using inappropriate methods to get results in their police work.

Anthony "Gaspipe" Casso 
According to Lucchese family underboss Anthony "Gaspipe" Casso when trying to enroll in Witness Protection in 1994, he and his boss Vittorio "Vic" Amuso had paid Eppolito and Caracappa $375,000 in bribes – and payments for murder contracts – beginning in 1985. Casso stated in 1986 that, as retaliation for an attempt on Casso's life – on the orders of Casso and Amuso – the two police detectives kidnapped and handed over James Hydell, an associate of the Gambino family, to be murdered by Casso.

Later, again on Casso's orders, Caracappa and Eppolito murdered made Lucchese member Bruno Facciolo with the assistance of Louis Daidone, due to Casso suspecting him of being an informant. Facciolo's murder is famous for the stuffed canary federal agents found in his mouth at the crime scene, considered to be a message to other informants.

At least partially in retaliation for the 1985 murder of Castellano, arranged by John Gotti, Casso ordered Caracappa and Eppolito to kill Gambino capo Edward "Eddie" Lino. On November 6, 1990, the detectives pulled Lino over in his 1990 Mercedes-Benz and shot him nine times.

Las Vegas "retirement" 
After wholesale indictments came down for almost every crime family in New York in the mid-1990s, Caracappa and Eppolito retired to Las Vegas. Casso later confirmed that both of the "Mafia Cops" were still involved in mob business from Nevada. They were contacted in 1993 by Lastorino to murder the new head of the Gambino family, John "Junior" Gotti, whose father was imprisoned for life in 1992. The plot failed.

Lastorino also wanted the detectives to murder the underboss of the Lucchese family, Stephen "Wonderboy" Crea, but this plot also failed due to indictments brought against the family. In the late 1990s, both Caracappa and Eppolito conspired to kill former Gambino underboss Salvatore "Sammy the Bull" Gravano, who had entered the Witness Protection Program in 1992 after testifying against the elder Gotti, and collect a reward promised by Gotti's brother Peter. Gravano was later arrested and convicted of drug trafficking in 2003 and was sentenced to serve nineteen years in prison.

Convictions and sentencing
After a long investigation, highlighted by Burton Kaplan's decision to testify against his former confederates, both Caracappa and Eppolito were arrested in March 2005 and charged with counts of racketeering, obstruction of justice, extortion, and eight counts of murder and conspiracy. These included the murders of James Hydell, Nicholas Guido, John "Otto" Heidel, John Doe, Anthony DiLapi, Bruno Facciolo, Edward Lino, and Bartholomew Boriello – and their involvement in the conspiracy to murder Gravano. Kaplan, a businessman and career criminal who had been the link between Casso and the two detectives, was the chief accuser, giving two days of riveting testimony at trial.

On June 30, 2006, the presiding federal judge, Jack B. Weinstein, threw out a racketeering murder conviction against Caracappa and Eppolito on a technicality – the five-year statute of limitations had expired on the key charge of racketeering conspiracy. On September 17, 2008, their racketeering convictions were ordered reinstated by a federal appeals court. New York City paid $18.4 million to settle seven lawsuits brought by families of the victims of Caracappa and Eppolito.

On March 6, 2009, Eppolito was sentenced to life imprisonment plus 100 years, and Caracappa to life plus 80 years. Each was fined more than $4 million. On July 23, 2010, their convictions were upheld by the Second Circuit.

Incarceration and death 
Caracappa was incarcerated at the United States Penitentiary, Coleman in Florida. He was transferred to a federal prison in North Carolina before dying of cancer on April 8, 2017.

Eppolito was incarcerated at the United States Penitentiary, Tucson, a high-security federal prison. He died on November 3, 2019, in federal custody at a Tucson hospital. His cause of death has not been disclosed.

Further reading

References

External links
New York Daily News article relating to the arrests, 2005.
Transcript of the indictment against both men , courtesy of ISPN.org, 2005.
Report of conviction, BBC, 2006.
"Mafia Cops Facing Life in Prison", AP, June 5, 2006.
60 Minutes, 2006.

American police detectives
New York City Police Department officers
American people convicted of murder
Lucchese crime family
People from Brooklyn
American gangsters of Italian descent
American police officers convicted of murder
Mafia hitmen
Police officers convicted of racketeering
American prisoners sentenced to life imprisonment
Prisoners sentenced to life imprisonment by the United States federal government
People convicted of murder by the United States federal government
Criminal duos
New York City Police Department corruption and misconduct
American people who died in prison custody
Gangsters sentenced to life imprisonment
Prisoners who died in United States federal government detention